37 Channels is the fifth studio album by American rock band Tantric, released on September 17, 2013 via Pavement Entertainment.

Background and recording
On August 8, 2013 via Pavement Entertainment, it was announced that Tantric would be releasing their fifth studio album titled 37 Channels on September 17, 2013.

Lead singer Hugo Ferreira remained the only sole member of the band during the album's recording.

Ferreira commented on the album saying:"I didn't let people jerk off all over this record, I'm very protective of it. I used to let things go, but I literally oversaw every aspect of 37 Channels." Ferreira also explained the songwriting of the album saying:"I can't afford a therapist, so this is what I do. I regurgitate all my angst and pain and confusion and joy. I'm showing more, letting people into my brain and heart."

Soon after the release of the album in the fall of 2013 Hugo recruited drummer TJ Taylor, bassist Scott Wilson and guitarist Derek Isaacs and went on to tour in support of the album.

Track listing

Personnel
Hugo Ferreira – lead vocals, guitar, bass guitar, piano
Austin John Winkler – guest vocals
Shooter Jennings – guest vocals
Leif Garrett – guest vocals
Kenny Olsen – lead guitar
Kevin McCreery – lead vocals
Scott Bartlett – guitar
Johnny K – guitar
 Kevin McCreery – rhythm guitar
Gary Morse – pedal steel guitar
Greg Upchurch – drums
Emanuel Cole – drums
John Abel – bass guitar

Charts
The album debuted at number 24 on the US Hard Rock Albums chart.

References
http://www.amazon.com/37-Channels-Tantric/dp/B00F4MG68E/ref=sr_1_1_bnp_1_mus?ie=UTF8&qid=1409416673&sr=8-1&keywords=tantric+37+channels

2013 albums
Tantric (band) albums